Ibrahim El Batout is an Egyptian filmmaker, based in Cairo, Egypt. Born in Port Said on 20 September 1963.

He has worked as a director, producer and cameraman capturing stories mainly about human loss, suffering, and displacement since 1987. He has directed numerous documentaries for international TV channels, such as ZDF, TBS, and ARTE. His documentary work has been honored by the Rory Peck Trust (2003), and has received the Axel Springer Award in Germany (1994 and 2000). As well as that his drama Ein Shams took home the Golden Bull, the top prize at the 54th Taormina Film Festival, 2008.

Ein Shams (The Eye of the Sun)
 Script Tamer El Said and Ibrahim El Batout
 Camera Hesham Farouk Ibrahim
 Editor Ahmed Abdalah
 Music Amir Khalaf
 Sound Mohab Mostafa Ezz
 Art Director Shaima Aziz
 Production and Sales Sherif Mandour
 Cast Hanan Youssef, Boutros Boutros Ghaly, Ramadan Khater, Hanan Adel, Samar Abdelwahab, Mariam Abodouma

Synopsis
From once being the capital of Egypt during the Pharaonic era and a sacred location marked by the visit of Jesus and the Virgin Mary, Ein Shams has become one of Cairo's poorest and most neglected neighbourhoods. Through the eyes of Shams, an eleven-year-old girl inhabitant of this neighborhood, the film captures the sadness and magic that envelops everyday life in Egypt. In a series of heart-rending events, the diverse characters of the film showcase the intricacies of Egypt's political system and social structure, and give a glimpse into the grievances of the Middle East region and the complex relationships of its nations.

Feature films
 2005 Ithaki (D.O.P., Producer, Writer, Director)
 2008 Ein Shams, The Eye of the Sun (Writer and Director)
 2010 Hawi  (Writer, Director, Producer and DP)
 2012 Winter of Discontent

Selected documentaries

 1996 Slavery in Southern Sudan (ZDF)
 1998 The Beginning of the War in Kosovo (ZDF)
 1999 The War in Kosovo (ZDF)
 1999 Nagib Mahfouz: Passage du siecle (ARTE)
 2000 A Day of an Ambulance Driver in Ramalla, Palestine (ZDF)
 2001 Three German Women Living in Gaza (WDR Germany)
 2001 The River that Connects Future EC Countries (ZDF)
 2002 Pilgrimage to Mecca (ZDF)
 2002 Drug Addiction in Kuwait (ZDF)
 2003 Mass Graves in Iraq (ZDF)
 2004 Baghdad (ZDF)
 2006 26 Seconds in Pakistan (Islamic Relief Foundation)
 2007 I am a Refugee in Cairo (Al Jazeera International)

Awards and honors
 1991:Honorary Award TBS for the coverage of the first Gulf War
 1994 Axel Springer Award for Female Circumcision in Ethiopia
 1996 ECHO for The Victim of a War that Ended
 2000 Axel Springer Award for A Day of an Ambulance Driver in Ramalla
 2003 Rory Peck Sony International Impact Award Finalist for Mass Graves in Iraq
 2008 The Golden Tauro at the Taormina Film Festival for Ein Shams
 2008 The Best First Film Award in Rotterdam Arab Film Festival for Ein Shams
 2008 Special Jury Mention in Cathage International film Festival For Ein Shams ( Eye of the Sun )
    2010    Best Arab Film Award Doha Tribeca Film Festival for Hawi
    2011    The Jury Award Rabat International Film Festival for Hawi
    2011    Best Film Award Beirut International Film Festival for Hawi
    2011    Best Screen Play  Beirut International Film Festival for Hawi
    2011    Honorable mention San Francisco Arab Film Festival for Hawi

External links and references
 Ithaki blogspot (Arabic)
 Article about Ibrahim EL Batout in Al-Ahram Weekly (English)
 Article about Ithaki by Joseph Fahim (English)
 Article about Ein Shams by Joseph Fahim (English)
 Article in Al Hayat (Arabic)
 The Rory Peck Awards 2003
 http://www.iloubnan.info/en/detail/16/67528

1963 births
Living people
Egyptian documentary filmmakers
Egyptian film directors
Egyptian film producers
People from Port Said